Spider mapping which is sometimes called Semantic map is a graphic organizer that can be used for brainstorming ideas, aspects, and thoughts of normally a single theme or topic. It gets its name because of the way it looks when drawn out. Typically done for writing stories, papers, and research brainstorming.

Main idea 
The main idea starts in the center, or where ever you choose to place it; sub ideas, views, support for or against, major conflicts and so on stem off of it and they also get stemmed off of throughout the process of mapping out ideas. There are many types of charts one can use, spider mapping is the most common.

How to plan it 
A spider map is a planning tool however additional planning is needed before and after, not every idea can be turned into a story or something writing worthy. There can many steps to take before or after creating a spider map; one is outlining.

How it helps 
Normally one would draw these charts out, getting ideas on paper is the best first start and when it is on paper it is out of your head and you can think of how characters or ideas link together, what the conflict is, what plot twists could make to story or idea more successful.

Subcategories 
Aside from the main point the sub stems hold the important ideas, people, and views, conflicts to the main character or idea. Many sub characters; Minor characters play comic relief, supporting, weaker conflict, thought provoking roles.

See also
 Mind map
 Concept map

References

External links 
ANITA C. ALL, LARAE I. HUYCKE, and MARK J. FISHER (2003) Instructional Tools for Nursing Education: CONCEPT MAPS. Nursing Education Perspectives: November 2003, Vol. 24, No. 6, pp. 311–317.
L, LARAE I. HUYCKE, and MARK J. FISHER (2003) Instructional Tools for Nursing Education: CONCEPT MAPS. Nursing Education Perspectives: November 2003, Vol. 24, No. 6, pp. 311–317.

Problem solving methods
Diagrams